Julius Jason Kim is a Korean-American theologian and president of The Gospel Coalition.

Biography 
Born in Los Angeles, Kim spent part of his childhood in South Korea before returning to California at the age of 12. He received a BA from Vanguard University, M.Div. from Westminster Seminary California, and Ph.D. from Trinity Evangelical Divinity School.

Kim taught at Trinity Evangelical Divinity School before moving to Westminster Seminary California in 2000, where he is Dean of Students and Professor of Practical Theology. Ordained in the Presbyterian Church in America, he is also an associate pastor at New Life Presbyterian Church in Escondido, California. As of February 2020, Kim became president of The Gospel Coalition and will demit his responsibilities with Westminster in July 2020.

Works

References

Living people
American people of Korean descent
American theologians
Vanguard University alumni
Trinity Evangelical Divinity School alumni
Westminster Seminary California alumni
Westminster Seminary California faculty
Year of birth missing (living people)